Hoseyn Dahish (also Romanized as Ḩoseyn Dahīsh) is a village in Hoveyzeh Rural District, in the Central District of Hoveyzeh County, Khuzestan Province, Iran. At the 2006 census, its population was 73, in 11 families.

References 

Populated places in Hoveyzeh County